Scott Smith (born October 19, 1981) is an American retired figure skater. He won three senior international medals—silver at the 2003 Nebelhorn Trophy and 2003 Karl Schäfer Memorial, gold at the 2005 Ondrej Nepela Memorial—and placed fifth at the 2005 Four Continents Championships.

Career
Smith represented the Skating Club of Boston. He is not to be confused with Scott Smith who skated pairs with Erin Goto and Christie Baca in southern California.

At the 2006 U.S. Championships, he was the only competitor to land a clean quadruple jump.

Smith trained, for a time, at the University of Delaware Figure Skating Club in Newark, Delaware, then moved to the Skating Club of Boston, and was coached by Mark Mitchell and Peter Johansson. His programs have been choreographed by Jamie Isley, Lori Nichol and Nikolai Morozov. Before the 2008 U.S. Figure Skating Championships, he changed coaches again, this time to work with Stephanie Grosscup in Salt Lake City.

Smith withdrew from the 2009 U.S. Championships due to muscle spasms in his back, just before he was to skate his short program. He hoped to compete at the 2010 U.S. Championships but needed surgery on his left hip in December 2009.

Programs

Results
GP: Grand Prix; JGP: Junior Grand Prix

References

External links

 Scott Smith Online - Official website
 
 Scott Smith at IceNetwork.com

American male single skaters
1981 births
University of Delaware people
Living people
Sportspeople from Fort Lauderdale, Florida